Oat pseudorosette virus is a pathogenic plant virus.

External links
ICTVdB - The Universal Virus Database: Oat pseudorosette virus
Family Groups - The Baltimore Method

Viral plant pathogens and diseases
Tenuiviruses